The UL-Jih Evolution is a conventionally laid out, two-seat, high-wing, single-engine ultralight, designed and built in the Czech Republic. Two variants were available in 2010.

Design and development

The first version of the Evolution, originally designed by Jaroslav Sedláĉek of the Czech company UL-Jih was marketed by WD Flugzeugleichtbau of Germany as the Dallach D.5 Evolution with series production starting in 2002. UL-Jih fabricated both this model and the earlier D.4 Fascination and claimed sole production and marketing rights to both when WD Flugzeugleichtbau ceased trading in 2005, though those rights are challenged by Swiss Light Aircraft AG who build their own versions.

The Evolution is an all-composite aircraft, which uses the same cantilever wings, control surfaces and empennage as the Fascination but has a high-wing configuration, rather than the latter's low wing. The wing is of trapezoidal plan, with ailerons that have external balance trim tabs and sealed nosegaps. Inboard, there are electrically operated Fowler flaps. The fuselage becomes slender towards the tail, where the trapezoidal tailplane is set at mid-height, the elevators having a small cutout for rudder movement. The fin is swept but the rudder has vertical edges; it extends to the bottom of the fuselage. The underwing cabin seats two in side-by-side configuration, with access via glazed side doors. The Evolution has a retractable tricycle undercarriage; all three legs retract rearwards into the fuselage, on which they are mounted. A ballistic recovery parachute is available as an option.

The Evolution may be powered either by a 73.5 kW (98.6 hp) Rotax 912ULS or a 59.6 kW (79.9 hp) Rotax 912UL.

Operational history
At least six Evolutions had been built by the time WD ceased trading in 2005 and 15 appeared on the mid-2010 civil registers of European countries, excluding Russia.

Variants
E80
Rotax 912UL engine.
E100
Rotax 912ULS engine.

Specifications (E100)

References

External links

2000s Czech ultralight aircraft
UL-Jih aircraft